Since World War II Warsaw has been the second most important centre of film production in Poland. As the capital of Poland it has also been featured in countless films, both Polish and foreign. The following is a list of such films.

Polish

 Love Is For Everyone (Każdemu wolno kochać, 1933) – directed by Mieczysław Krawicz
 Jego ekscelencja subiekt (1933)
 Antek the Police Chief (Antek Policmajster, 1935) – directed by Michał Waszyński
 Kochaj tylko mnie (1935)
 The Treasure (Skarb, 1948) – directed by Leonard Buczkowski 
 Adventure in Marienstadt (Przygoda na Mariensztacie, 1953) – directed by Leonard Buczkowski
 Five Boys from Barska Street (Piątka z ulicy Barskiej, 1954) - directed by Aleksander Ford
 A Generation (Pokolenie, 1954) – directed by Andrzej Wajda
 Warszawa 1905 roku (1955)
 Irena do domu! (1955) – directed by Jan Fethke
 Kanal (Kanał, 1956) – directed by Andrzej Wajda
 Nikodem Dyzma (1956) – directed by Jan Rybkowski 
 Heroism (Eroica, 1957) – directed by Andrzej Munk
 Answer to Violence (Zamach, 1958) – directed by Jerzy Passendorfer
 Ashes and Diamonds (Popioł i diament, 1958) – directed by Andrzej Wajda
 Octopus Cafe (Cafe Pod Minogą, 1959) – directed by Bronisław Brok
 My Old Man (Mój stary, 1962) – directed by Janusz Nasfeter
 Penguin (Pingwin, 1964) – directed by Jerzy Stefan Stawiński
 Paris - Warsaw Without a Visa (Paryż – Warszawa bez wizy, 1967) – directed by Hieronim Przybył
 Samson – directed by Andrzej Wajda (1967)
 The Cruise (Rejs, 1970) – directed by Marek Piwowski
 Man-Woman Wanted (Poszukiwany, poszukiwana, 1972) – directed by Stanisław Bareja
 A Jungle Book of Regulations (Nie ma róży bez ognia, 1974) – directed by Stanisław Bareja
 What Will You Do When You Catch Me? (Co mi zrobisz jak mnie złapiesz, 1978) – directed by Stanisław Bareja
 Wherever You Are, Mr. President (Gdziekolwiek jesteś, panie prezydencie, 1978) – directed by Andrzej Trzos-Rastawiecki
 Without Anesthesia (Bez znieczulenia, 1978) – directed by Andrzej Wajda
 Teddy Bear (Miś, 1980) – directed by Stanisław Bareja
 Korczak – directed by Andrzej Wajda (1990)
 Calls Controlled (Rozmowy kontrolowane, 1991) – directed by Sylwester Chęciński
 The Crowned-Eagle Ring (Pierścionek z orłem w koronie, 1992) – directed by Andrzej Wajda
 Warsaw - Year 5703 (Warszawa. Annee 5703, 1992) – directed by Janusz Kijowski
 Avalon – directed by Mamoru Oshii (2001)
 Warsaw (Warszawa, 2003) – directed by Dariusz Gajewski
 Nigdy w życiu! – directed by Ryszard Zatorski (2004)

Foreign

 To Be or Not to Be – directed by Ernst Lubitsch (1942)
 The Night of the Generals – directed by Anatole Litvak (1967)
 The Minor Apocalypse – directed by Costa-Gavras (1993)
 Leningrad Cowboys Meet Moses – directed by Aki Kaurismäki (1994)
 Avalon – directed by Mamoru Oshii (2001)
 The Foreigner – directed by Michael Oblowitz (2002)
 The Pianist – directed by Roman Polański (2002)
 The Aryan Couple – directed by John Daly (2004)
 Karol: A Man Who Became Pope – directed by Giacomo Battiato (2005)
 Kick - directed by Sajid Nadiadwala (2014)

 
Warsaw
Films set in Warsaw
Warsaw
Films